The Church of St Augustine in West Monkton, Somerset, England, dates from the 13th century and has been designated as a Grade I listed building.

The parish church has an  tower, of four stories, with no pinnacles or fancy tracery on the windows, giving the tower a slender, austere look compared to the medieval Somerset towers of churches in nearby Taunton, for example. Nikolaus Pevsner proposes that St Augustine's tower is older than the surrounding church towers, with a tower arch that may date to 1300 as part of a previous church building.

The churchyard includes a stocks and whipping post under a canopy.

See also

 List of Grade I listed buildings in Taunton Deane
 List of towers in Somerset
 List of ecclesiastical parishes in the Diocese of Bath and Wells

References

Church of England church buildings in Taunton Deane
13th-century church buildings in England
Grade I listed churches in Somerset
Grade I listed buildings in Taunton Deane